The Birmingham City Council is the legislative branch that governs the City of Birmingham, Alabama, United States. It has nine members elected by district, and regularly meets on Tuesday mornings at Birmingham City Hall. The council has 11 subcommittees, each of which contains three members.

The council was formed in 1963, when the city adopted the Mayor-Council Act of 1955. It replaced the Birmingham City Commission, the city's previous form of government. The council's current president is William Parker; the current president pro tempore is Wardine Alexander.

Members
District 1: Clinton Woods (2018–present)
District 2: Hunter Williams (2017–present)
District 3: Valerie Abbott (2001–present)
District 4: William Parker (2013–present)
District 5: Darrell O'Quinn (2017–present)
District 6: Crystal Smitherman (2018–present)
District 7: Wardine Alexander (2018–present)
District 8: Steven Hoyt (2005–present)
District 9: John Hilliard (2017–present)

References

City councils in the United States
Government of Birmingham, Alabama